Aletta van Manen (born 20 October 1958) is a retired Dutch field hockey defender, who won a gold medal at the 1984 Summer Olympics, and a bronze at the 1988 Games.

From 1983 to 1988 she played a total number of 81 international matches for Holland, in which she scored two goals. Van Manen retired after the 1988 Summer Olympics in South Korea.

References

External links
 

1958 births
Living people
Dutch female field hockey players
Olympic field hockey players of the Netherlands
Field hockey players at the 1984 Summer Olympics
Field hockey players at the 1988 Summer Olympics
Olympic gold medalists for the Netherlands
Olympic bronze medalists for the Netherlands
People from Wageningen
Sportspeople from Gelderland
Olympic medalists in field hockey
Medalists at the 1988 Summer Olympics
Medalists at the 1984 Summer Olympics
HGC players
20th-century Dutch women
21st-century Dutch women